International Indian Public School Riyadh (IIPS-R), formerly SEVA School is a K–12 gender-isolated English-medium community-based international school in as-Sulaimaniyah, Riyadh, Saudi Arabia. Established in 1995, it primarily serves the Indian diaspora of the city and provides Indian curriculum prescribed by the Central Board of Secondary Education. It is a member of the CBSE Gulf Sahodaya and is approved by the Ministry of Education, Government of Saudi Arabia.

History 
International Indian Public School was established in 1995 as SEVA School. In 1998, its name was renamed to its current name. In 2012, Imtiaz Ahmed, an area sales manager for Saudi Scaffolding Factory was elected as the new chairman of the school. In the same year, Ali Hasan Adnan, a student from the school bagged a prestigious scholarship from the Indian Ministry of Science and Technology to pursue his higher education. In 2015, the school organized a science exhibition on the birth anniversary of former Indian president APJ Abdul Kalam. In 2016, the school honored around 200 of its students for its outstanding performance and for winning various positions in diverse competitions including sports. In 2018, the school shifted its campus to Malaz district.

See also
 Yara International School

References 

Schools in Riyadh
Education in Saudi Arabia